Monkey Spunk is a compilation EP by English pop group Frazier Chorus, self-released by the band in 1998. The EP includes five previously unreleased demos (with a few brief interludes) which were recorded following the band's split from Virgin Records but before the recording of the Wide Awake album (1995). This "official bootleg" release was only available through the Frazier Chorus website.

Track listing
All songs written by Tim Freeman.

"Christmas Every Year" – 3:24
"(Answerphone 1)" – 0:35
"I Want You Around" – 3:22
"(Wide Awake Control Room Excerpt)" – 0:41
"If the Weather Was Up to Me" – 3:00
"(Radio Chit-Chat)" – 0:24
"So You're Sorry" – 4:23
"(Answerphone 2)" – 0:35
"Good Grief" – 3:19

Personnel
Musicians
Tim Freeman
Jamie Freeman
Benny Dimassa 

Technical
Richard Digby Smith – engineer

References

1998 EPs
Frazier Chorus albums